Pleurocera acuta, common name the sharp hornsnail, is a species of small freshwater snail with a gill and an operculum, an aquatic gastropod mollusk in the family Pleuroceridae, the hornsnails.

Shell description 
The shell can have up to 14 whorls. The shell of this species can be as long as 37 mm.

Distribution
Pleurocera acuta is native to the United States. It occurs in the Ohio River and Great Lakes drainages; the Mississippi River west to Kansas and Nebraska.

This species is listed as threatened in some Midwestern states.

The nonindigenous distribution of Pleurocera acuta includes the Lower Hudson River drainage and Oneida Lake in New York State. It was introduced there, probably via the Erie Canal.

Ecology 
This species is found in freshwater rivers and streams where it burrows in sand and mud. Eggs are laid in the spring.

References 
This article incorporates public domain text from the reference

Further reading 
 Dazo B. C. (1962). "The morphology and natural history of Pleurocera acuta Rafinesque and Goniobasis livescens (Menke) (Mollusca: Gastropoda: Prosobranchia)". Biological Station, University of Michigan (UMBS). http://deepblue.lib.umich.edu/handle/2027.42/52120
 Katherine Hanke Houp. (January 1970) "Population Dynamics of Pleurocera acuta in a Central Kentucky Limestone Stream". American Midland Naturalist 83(1): 81-88.
 Strong E. E. (2005) "A morphological reanalysis of Pleurocera acuta Rafinesque, 1831, and Elimia livescens (Menke, 1830) (Gastropoda: Cerithioidea: Pleuroceridae)". The Nautilus 119(4): 119-132. abstract, http://hdl.handle.net/10088/7388

Pleuroceridae
Molluscs of North America
Fauna of the Great Lakes region (North America)
Fauna of the Plains-Midwest (United States)
Fauna of Nebraska
Gastropods described in 1831
Taxa named by Constantine Samuel Rafinesque